William Zinn may refer to:
 William B. Zinn, Virginia politician
 William V. Zinn, British civil engineer